Shikhly or Şıxlı may refer to:
Birinci Şıxlı, Azerbaijan
İkinci Şıxlı, Azerbaijan
Şıxlı, Agdash, Azerbaijan
Şıxlı, Fizuli, Azerbaijan
Şıxlı, Goychay, Azerbaijan